Ilomantis thalassina is a species of praying mantis in the family Nanomantidae.

References

Nanomantidae
Articles created by Qbugbot
Insects described in 1899
Insects of Madagascar
Endemic fauna of Madagascar